The 1986–87 A Group was the 39th season of the A Football Group, the top Bulgarian professional league for association football clubs, since its establishment in 1948.

Overview
It was contested by 16 teams, and CSKA Sofia won the championship.

Teams

Stadiums and locations

Personnel

League standings

Results

Champions
CSKA Sofia

Top scorers

Awards

Team of the Season

References

External links
Bulgaria - List of final tables (RSSSF)

First Professional Football League (Bulgaria) seasons
Bulgaria
1986–87 in Bulgarian football